Applied Artificial Intelligence is a peer-reviewed scientific journal covering applications of artificial intelligence in management, industry, engineering, administration, and education, as well as evaluations of existing AI systems and tools and their economic, social, and cultural impact.

Abstracting and indexing 
The journal is abstracted and indexed in:

External links 
 

Computer science journals
Artificial intelligence publications
Taylor & Francis academic journals
English-language journals
Publications established in 1987